Terra Jolé Odmark (born May 25, 1980, in Comal County, Texas) is a reality television personality known for Little Women: LA and its spinoffs and Dancing with the Stars. She stands at 4'2" as a person with dwarfism.

Career
Jolé is part of the cast and one of the executive producers of the Lifetime television shows Little Women: LA and Terra’s Little Family. Both shows began in 2014. Jolé also works as executive producer of spinoffs Little Women: ATL and Little Women: NY and Little Women: Dallas. She is a member of the Producers Guild of America.

In 2016, Jolé released a full album of children’s songs titled Penny’s Playlist. The project was dedicated to her daughter.

Jolé launched MiniMama.com, a website that features original content for mothers and children.

On August 30, 2016, Jolé was announced as one of the celebrities who would take part in season 23 of Dancing with the Stars. Her professional partner was Sasha Farber. The couple were eliminated in Week 10 of the competition, after receiving two perfect scores and therefore finished in fifth place.

Personal life
Jolé resides in Los Angeles, California and is married to fellow Little Women: LA star Joe Gnoffo.

On March 16, 2015, the couple had a daughter named Penelope Charlevoix Gnoffo. On August 1, 2016, their son, Grayson Vincent D’Artagnan Gnoffo, was born. On March 11, 2020, their second daughter, Magnolia August, was born.

Jolé is a supporter of the non-profit organization Forte Animal Rescue. She is passionate about animals and has adopted and cared for dozens of pets without homes over the years.

Filmography

Television

Film

Books
 Fierce at Four Foot Two (2017)

References

External links
 
 

Television producers from Texas
American women television producers
Actors with dwarfism
Living people
People from Comal County, Texas
Participants in American reality television series
1980 births
21st-century American women